Guy Scott Leveque (December 28, 1972 – September 27, 2005) was a Canadian professional ice hockey centre.

Playing career
Leveque played for the Cornwall Royals of the Ontario Hockey League from 1989 until 1992.  He was drafted 42nd overall in the second round of the 1991 NHL Entry Draft by the Los Angeles Kings.  Leveque split 1992–93 and 1993–94 between the Kings and the IHL's Phoenix Roadrunners.  He spent much of 1994–95 with the Canada national men's ice hockey team, but also spent some time with the Roadrunners and the St. John's Maple Leafs of the American Hockey League.  He spent the entire 1995–96 season with the Manitoba Moose, the 1996–97 season with the San Antonio Dragons, and 1997–98 with the Phoenix Mustangs of the West Coast Hockey League before finally retiring from professional hockey.

Leveque was a member of the Los Angeles Kings during the 1993 Stanley Cup Playoffs.  Led by Wayne Gretzky, the Kings made the final against the Montreal Canadiens.  Leveque was forced to sit out the final with an injury.

Death

Leveque was found drowned to death in a pool of water in St. Catharines, Ontario on October 2, 2005.  Police estimated his date of death as September 27.  Police have remained baffled by the death, but it was known by family that Leveque suffered from an OxyContin addiction that developed through usage for back pain that had plagued him since junior hockey and that he suffered from bouts with depression.

External links

Article about the Life and Death of Guy Leveque

1972 births
2005 deaths
Canadian ice hockey centres
Cornwall Royals (OHL) players
Franco-Ontarian people
Ice hockey people from Ontario
Sportspeople from Kingston, Ontario
Los Angeles Kings draft picks
Los Angeles Kings players
Minnesota Moose players
Phoenix Mustangs players
Phoenix Roadrunners (IHL) players
St. John's Maple Leafs players
San Antonio Dragons players